Charlie is the third album by Melt-Banana. This album was the first release on their own label, A-Zap.

Charlie features guest appearances by Mike Patton and Mr. Bungle on the song "Area 877 [Phoenix Mix]". Mike Patton says: "MELT... BANANA!" at the beginning of the song and Melt-Banana have sampled this through many of their other songs including "7.2 Seconds Flipping", "Brick Again" and the version of "Bad Gut Missed Fist" on their live album MxBx 1998/13,000 Miles At Light Velocity.

Charlie was named after the film of the same name, based on the novel Flowers for Algernon.

Track listing 

There is also an untitled track hidden in the pregap before the first track, which is a cover of the song "Neat Neat Neat" by The Damned. It is 2 minutes and 14 seconds long followed by a minute of silence.

References 

1998 albums
Melt-Banana albums